Laxou is a commune in the Meurthe-et-Moselle department in north-eastern France. It is a suburb, adjacent to the west of Nancy.

2002 125cc motorcycle world champion Arnaud Vincent was born here.

Population

See also
 Communes of the Meurthe-et-Moselle department

References

Communes of Meurthe-et-Moselle